Paul Casey is an Irish songwriter, guitarist and singer.

Paul's song "Blow Away the Clouds" was used on MTV's The Real World Brooklyn (Eps 7: Of Mice and Devyn's Men).

He has released a new album called Scrapbook and was a special guest on a 2010 Chris Rea's Still So Far to Go European musical tour.

References

External links 
 
 Myspace profile

Irish guitarists
Irish male guitarists
Irish songwriters
Irish male singers
Living people
Year of birth missing (living people)